The Polish (PKP) railway signalling system provides a complex outlook of traffic situations, yet is quite easy to understand. Signals can be divided into following categories:
 near and distant displays — signals (semi-automatic, automatic)
 distant-only displays
 repeater signals
 shunting signals

Most signals are colour lights.

On few stations remained mechanical signals, as well as old colour light signals.

Colour light signals

Semi-automatic signals

Semi-automatic is the most important type of signal on Polish railways. Its name reflects the fact that it switches to a red (stop) aspect automatically after a train has passed it but it must be switched back to clear by an explicit action from a signal box or dispatch centre. It is the typical signal in use at stations.

A semi-automatic signal can be recognized by its post which is painted with red and white strips. Dwarf versions have their boxes painted so.

A red (stop) aspect on a semi-automatic signal must not be passed.

As presented on this compact chart, semi-automatic signals can display both near and distant functions. Near signals either command a stop or impose a certain speed limit beginning at that signal. Distant signals tell the driver what to expect at the next signal, especially when braking is required.

Other speeds
Since 2007 the Ie-1 code which regards signalling allows other speed limits. They are indicated by a number representing the speed in tens of km/h (e.g. 5 means 50 km/h) which is lit only with a more restrictive signalling aspect, such that the displayed number relaxes the regular aspect:

 a speed limit of 50 km/h is indicated by a digit 5 with aspects S10—S13
 speed limits of 70, 80, 90 km/h are indicated by digits 7, 8, 9 with aspects S10a—S13a
 speed limits of 120 or 130 km/h are indicated by numbers 12 or 13 with aspects S6—S9

On distant signals and repeaters these other speeds are not displayed, therefore a more restrictive aspect is effectively announced.

Nameplates
Semi-automatic signals on a station are tagged with consecutive letters of Latin alphabet, or with a letter followed by a number representing the track number the signal is located on (if multiple signals use the same letter).

The nameplates also contain speed indication which appears as a superscript or a fraction. The numbers have following meaning:
 1 this signal is followed by a switch with straight direction, Vmax is possible
 2 this signal is followed by a switch with diverging direction of 40 km/h
 3 this signal is followed by a switch with diverging direction of 100 km/h
 4 this signal is followed by a switch with diverging direction of 60 km/h

Therefore, a nameplate H 1/2 means a signal named H that aside from S1 will also display S2-S5 aspects for straight direction and S10-S13 for diverging direction. Whereas P3 2 means a signal named P3 that aside from S1 only displays S10-S13 aspects because it's followed only by diverging points.

There may also be a letter m which specifies that this signal also functions as a shunting signal (see below).

Subsidiary signal

Automatic signals
Automatic signals are used on lines equipped with automatic block signaling. Their colour language is the same as aspects S1-S5 of semi-automatic signals. The main difference regards the S1 (red) aspect - After stopping, it can be passed but the subsequent maximum speed is limited to 20 km/h.

Automatic signals have their posts painted white (without red strips) to be easily distinguished from semi-automatic signals.

Automatic signals are numbered by their nearest kilometre post multiplied by 10, odd numbers on the down track and even numbers on the up track. Signals on the track opposite to typical traffic (usually on the left track as Polish railways operate on the right track by default) have the letter N appended to the resulting number. A set of bi-directional automatic signals located on the 324.09 km marker will therefore be numbered 3241 on the down track, 3240 on the up track, 3241N on the down track reverse, and 3240N on the up track reverse. In the case of multi-track arrangements with signals located close to each other on different lines, other letters may be affixed to the numbers to distinguish signals on different tracks.

Distant-only signals
 Distant-only signal (Pol. tarcza ostrzegawcza literally meaning warning shield) is used on lines not equipped with ABS and lines with 2-state ABS. These signals are usually placed at braking distance from the next signal. The aspects they display are the same as signal aspects S2-S5, making them technically a signal which is just incapable of displaying a S1 (stop) aspect, however its aspects are not enforced.

Their posts are painted grey and equipped with a distant-only signal sign.

These signals are numbered with 'To' preceding the name of the signal it precedes, i.e. ToB will be the distant signal to B.

Repeater signals
When a signal aspect is not visible from the proper distance (because of track curves for instance), a repeater signal is installed to aid drivers. Up to three repeaters may be installed if needed. A repeater signal is not a substitute for a distant-only signal.
 
Their posts are painted grey and equipped with plates with Roman numerals: III, II, I where the "I" stands closest to the main signal. Their colour language is identical to warning shields, except the fact they also have a continuously glowing white light, which informs that this is not a main signal but a repeater.

These signals are numbered with the Roman numeral, 'Sp', and the number of the signal it repeats. For example, the second repeater ahead of a signal G will be called IISpG.

The following table presents as an example, a station-entry signal designated "B" displaying the aspect S13 (speed limit 40 km/h, stop at the next signal) preceded with distant-only signal and three repeaters:

Level crossing warning
Level crossing warning is placed in a braking distance before an automatic level crossing. The signal tells the driver whether automobile drivers are warned about an approaching train (blinking red lights, barriers). Normally, level crossing warning signals display no aspect (i.e. are unlit). They light up in the front of an approaching train which is the first clue that the system is working correctly.

Level crossing warning signals are unrelated to other signals, therefore in case of Osp1 signal a train must proceed at 20 km/h regardless the higher speed allowed by last signal.

Their posts are painted black and white strips. They are numbered by the kilometre location of the level crossing they refer to, multiplied by 10 - other than the milepost reference difference, their numbering functions like that of automatic block signals.

Shunting signals
Shunting signals (Pol. tarcza manewrowa literally manoeuver shield) are used exclusively at stations. A consist shunting on such signals must not leave the station. Shunting signals are either stand-alone or incorporated into semi-automatic signals, which include the letter "m" in their name on such occasions.

Stand-alone shunting signals have their posts painted gray, except in the case it is a part of the semi-automatic signal, which is painted with white-red stripes. Stand-alone shunting signals are numbered with 'Tm' preceding an Arabic number, and are numbered independently of other signalling or points within a station, e.g. Tm7.

Old colour light signals 
The colour light signals installed between 1959 and 1969 differ from the contemporary system. They are still in use at several stations. As a matter of fact they can also be used with ETCS Level 1, only the LEU unit must be reprogrammed to understand certain combinations of lights differently.

Mechanical signals

See also 
 Osshd railway signalling
 Railway semaphore signal

External links 
 Polish railway signal simulators (Java applets)

Railway signalling in Poland